The sixth season of television drama series Wentworth premiered on Showcase in Australia on 19 June 2018 and concluded on 4 September 2018. It is executively produced by FremantleMedia's Director of Drama, Jo Porter. The season comprised 12 episodes. The sixth season picks up the days after the escape of Franky Doyle and Joan Ferguson. This season introduced three new characters portrayed by Leah Purcell, Susie Porter and Rarriwuy Hick.

Plot 
Days have passed since the bold escape of Franky Doyle and Joan Ferguson. Kaz steels herself for Top Dog duties since Ferguson's demise, Sonia Stevens' life and Governor Bennett's career hang in the balance as Boomer pieces together the events of Sonia's apparent poisoning. Liz begins to fear for her life. Will continues flashbacks of Ferguson's apparent final moments. Rita Connors is admitted to Wentworth hiding a secret that could change everything and joining her is Ruby Mitchell and Marie Winter - will the prison walls be enough to keep these women safe?

Cast

Main
 Leah Purcell as Rita Connors
 Sigrid Thornton as Sonia Stevens
 Susie Porter as Marie Winter
 Celia Ireland as Liz Birdsworth
 Katrina Milosevic as Sue "Boomer" Jenkins
 Robbie J Magasiva as Deputy Governor Will Jackson
 Tammy Macintosh as Kaz Proctor
 Kate Jenkinson as Allie Novak
 Bernard Curry as Jake Stewart 
 Rarriwuy Hick as Ruby Mitchell
 Kate Atkinson as Governor Vera Bennett
 Nicole da Silva as Franky Doyle

Special guest
 Pamela Rabe as Joan Ferguson

Recurring
 Libby Tanner as Bridget Westfall
 Jacquie Brennan as Linda Miles
 Sally-Anne Upton as Lucy "Juice" Gambaro
 Maddy Jevic as Nurse Lee Radcliffe
 Artemis Ioannides as Vicky Kosta
 Kate Elliot as Spike Baxter
 Sun Park as Cherry Li 
 Emily Havea as Mon Alson
 Catherine Larcey as Sharon Gilmour
 Bessie Holland as Stella Radic
 Sarah Hallam as Jen "Hutch" Hutchins
 Katerina Kotsonis as Brenda Murphy
 Stefan Dennis as Michael Armstrong QC
 Martin Sacks as Derek Channing
 Shane Connor as Ray Houser 
 Natalia Novikova as Zara "Drago" Dragovich

Episodes

Production
On 9 May 2017, it was announced that FremantleMedia had renewed Wentworth for a sixth season, set to air in 2018.

FremantleMedia's Director of Drama, Jo Porter, said "Getting to a sixth season is something none of us take for granted. Key to this is the unwavering dedication to the show by the incredible Wentworth audience both in Australia and around the world. Like us they are drawn to our exceptional cast who embody the diverse, complex and intriguing characters who populate the intense world of Wentworth and its high stakes and compelling stories.

Foxtel Head of Drama, Penny Win, said "As Foxtel's longest running original drama (though originally created by Channel 10 called "Prisoner" in 1979), Wentworth continues to set a high bar for our local production slate. There is so much yet to unfold with season five premiering now in Australia on Foxtel before any details should be revealed about the sixth season. My lips are sealed other than to say Marcia Gardner and the writers continue to excel in setting up intriguing story arcs and finely crafted scripts for the wonderfully talented Wentworth cast to bring to life."

Reception

Ratings

Accolades 

 AACTA Awards
 Nominated: Best Lead Actress in a Television Drama – Leah Purcell
 Nominated: Best Guest or Supporting Actress in a Television Drama – Celia Ireland
 Nominated: Best Television Drama Series – Wentworth
 Equity Ensemble Awards
 Nominated: Most Outstanding Performance by an Ensemble in a Drama Series – Wentworth
 Logie Awards
 Nominated: Most Outstanding Actor – Robbie Magasiva
 Nominated: Most Outstanding Actress – Leah Purcell
 Nominated: Most Outstanding Supporting Actor – Bernard Curry
 Nominated: Most Outstanding Supporting Actress – Celia Ireland
 Nominated: Most Popular Drama Program – Wentworth
 Won: Most Outstanding Drama Series – Wentworth
 Screen Producers Australia
 Nominated: SPA Award for Drama Series Production of the Year – Wentworth

Home media

References

External links 
 

2018 Australian television seasons
Wentworth (TV series)